The 5th Edition of Arab Champions League 2007–08

The Format 
 Each federation enter with (1~2) teams from their top Leagues
 – The teams must be one of the top 5 teams in the latest season, or Cup Champions/Runners-up.

 The Number of teams of each federation enters based on the previous editions results of the Arab Champions League
 The official sponsor ART can choose the rest teams to complete the 32 teams, so it may can reach 3 teams from one country
 – It's not necessary to be one of the top 5 teams.

  Entente Sportive de Sétif entered automatically as 2006–2007 Champion.

Participated teams 
32 clubs will be competing from the following countries.

Asia

Africa

The System 
 Round 32: Knock out stage
 Round 16: Knock out stage
 Round 8: Groups Stage
 Semifinals and final: Knock out stage

The Awards 
 The Champions: $1,500,000
 The Runner-up: $1,000,000
 Round 4: $400,000
 Round 8: $300,000
 Round 16: $60,000
 Round 32: $30,000

Round 32 
32 teams play home and away matches as Knock out stage.

|}

 1  Shabab Rafah withdrew.

Match dates 
 The first legs on 12 and 17/18 September 2007
 The second legs on 1/2 October 2007

Round 16 
16 teams play home and away matches as knock out stage.

|}

 1  Al-Arabi Disqualified, Kuwait have been indefinitely suspended from international football competitions.

Matches Dates 
 The first legs on 22 /5 November 2007
 The second legs on 6 /15 November 2007

Round 8 
 8 teams play home and away matches in 2 Groups, 4 teams in each group.
 the Groups winners and the runners-up qualify to the semifinals.

Group A

Group B

The Semi-Finals

The Final

Winners

Top scorers 
Last updated: 22 May 2008.

References

External links 
 Arab Champions' League 2007/08 – rsssf.com
 

Arab Champions League, 2007-08
Arab Champions League, 2007-08
Arab Champions League, 2007-08
Arab Champions League, 2007-08
Arab Club Champions Cup